Glen Ross may refer to:

Glen Ross, Ontario, a community in Quinte West
Glenn Ross, a Northern Ireland strongman and powerlifter
Glenn Ross (politician), an engineer and politician from the Falkland Islands
Glengarry Glen Ross, a 1984 play by David Mamet
Glengarry Glen Ross (film), a 1992 film adapted from the play